When a Man Sees Red is a 1917 American silent drama film produced and distributed by the Fox Film Corporation and directed by Frank Lloyd. William Farnum stars in this now lost film. It was remade in 1934 as Pursued.

This was the debut film of prolific character actor Frank Ellis.

Plot
As described in a film magazine, after a long sea voyage, Larry Smith (Farnum) comes home to find his sister (Bower) dead, the victim of some unknown person. Shortly after his mother (Drew) dies of a broken heart, Smith sets sail with a determination to wreck vengeance upon the murderer. Unknowingly he has become a mate to Captain Sutton (Nye), the man who ruined his sister. At a South Sea port Smith meets Violet North (Carmen), known as the Painted Lady. Smith falls in love with her and proposes, but she will not marry him because of her past, and the next day sails away with the rest of her party. Logan (Robbins), one of the "dogs" on Sutton's vessel, was a witness to Sutton's attack on the Smith girl and for this reason Sutton sails away leaving Logan on shore alone. Logan meets Smith and tells his tale. Logan and Smith search the islands for a trace of Sutton. When a storm rises and Violet, aboard a yacht, is tossed onto the island occupied by Smith. Sutton also comes ashore on a boat. Thirst for revenge seizes Smith and he attacks Sutton, who dies in the fight. Violet nurses Sutton back to health and sanity.

Cast
William Farnum - Larry Smith
Jewel Carmen - Violet North
G. Raymond Nye - Captain Sutton
Lulu May Bower - Larry's Sister
Cora Drew - Larry's Mother
Marc Robbins - Logan
A. Burt Wesner - Lewis

unbilled
Horace B. Carpenter 
Frank Ellis
Bill Patton

See also
 1937 Fox vault fire

References

External links

Southseascinema.org

1917 films
American silent feature films
Films directed by Frank Lloyd
Films based on short fiction
Fox Film films
Lost American films
1917 drama films
American black-and-white films
Silent American drama films
1917 lost films
Lost drama films
1910s American films